The women's 4 × 100 metres relay event at the 2002 Asian Athletics Championships was held in Colombo, Sri Lanka on 10 August.

Results

References

2002 Asian Athletics Championships
Relays at the Asian Athletics Championships
2002 in women's athletics